Nur Salman (born 1937) is a Lebanese writer.

She was born in Beirut and received a BA in Arabic literature from the Beirut College for Girls, a MA in comparative literature from the American University of Beirut and a state doctorate in Arabic literature from Saint Joseph University. She is a professor of Arabic literature at the Lebanese University.

Salman is a member of the board for the National Conservatory. She is also a member of the Lebanese Women's Council and the Lebanese Child Care Association.

Selected works 
 Fadahikat ("And She Laughed") novel (1960)
 Yabqa al-bahr wa-I-sama''' ("The Sea and Sky Remain") short stories (1966)
 al-Shi'r al-suji("Sufi Poetry") literary criticism (1980)
 al-A dab al-Jaza'iri ji rihab al-rafd wa-I-tahrir ("Algerian Literature in the Broad Expanses of Rejection and Liberation") literary criticism (1981)
 al-Lughat al-Samiya wa-I-Iugha al-'Arabiya ("Semitic Languages and Arabic") non-fiction (1981)
 Madkhal ila dirasat al-shi'r al-ramzi ji-I-adab al-hadith ("Introduction to the Study of Symbolic Poetry in Modern Literature") literary criticism (1981)
 Adwa' 'ala-I-tasawwuf al-Islami ("Illuminating Sufism") non-fiction (1982) 
 Ila rajullam ya 'ti ("To a Man Who Did Not Come") poetry (1986)
 al- 'Ayn al-hamra' ("The Red Eye") short stories (1991)
 Li-fajr yashuqq al-hajar ("Toward a Rocksplitting Dawn") poetry (1994)
 Lan utji' al-wajd'' ("I Will Not Snuff Out Love") poetry (1997)

References 

1937 births
Living people
Lebanese women poets
Lebanese novelists
Lebanese women short story writers
Lebanese short story writers
American University of Beirut alumni
Saint Joseph University alumni
Academic staff of Lebanese University
Writers from Beirut